Sapphire Chrystalla Elia (born 15 April 1987) is an English actress, model and singer best known for her roles in musical drama Britannia High and the soap opera Emmerdale.

Early and personal life
Sapphire Chrystalla Elia was born on 15 April 1987 in London. Elia is of Greek-Cypriot heritage.
She is 3/4 Greek and 1/4 English.

Career
Elia modelled for brands such as Dolce & Gabbana, Selfridges and Debenhams from the age of three. She later went on to appear in a number of adverts. In 1996, Elia began attending the Sylvia Young Theatre School. She was cast in the role of a young Cosette in Trevor Nunn's theatre production of Les Misérables at the Palace Theatre.

In 1998, Elia became an entertainer on ITV's Fun Song Factory for one series. Two years later she became a presenter on Discovery Kids, which led to a two-hour reality show called Blast Off, where she attended the NASA Astronaut Training Camp for children. In 2002, Elia played Isabelle in the educational series, Energy for Pearson Education. The following year, she graduated from Sylvia Young.

In 2006, the actress was cast as Gemma Craig in the television drama series Dream Team. Elia played two Polly Delwar and Kerry in two separate stints in The Bill.

In 2008, Elia successfully auditioned for the musical drama series Britannia High. She was cast as Claudine Cameron. During her time on the show, she recorded a song 'Do It All Over Again'. The song peaked at #21 on the UK charts and it also entered the Australian charts at #12.  A year later, Elia played Snow White in a Christmas pantomime at the Richmond Theatre. In 2010, the actress played the role of Amber in the movie Black Forest for the Syfy channel. In September of that year, Elia joined the cast of Emmerdale as Mia Macey. In May 2011, Elia confirmed her departure from Emmerdale.

Sapphire appeared on second cover to Image 34 magazine in June 2012.

 In July 2020 Sapphire and her Partner Matthew set up a Consulting Agency called "alterniq inspired growth" with the Slogan, "We aim to help companies uncover talent within their workforce through a range of specialised programmes".

Filmography

Theatre

References

External links

Sapphire Elia on Twitter
Sapphire Elia on Facebook
alterniq inspired growth Website

1987 births
Living people
Alumni of the Sylvia Young Theatre School
British television actresses
British people of Greek Cypriot descent